Bastrop may refer to the following places in the US, named directly or indirectly for Felipe Enrique Neri, Baron de Bastrop:

 Bastrop, Louisiana
 Bastrop High School (Louisiana)
 Bastrop County, Texas
 Bastrop, Texas
 Bastrop High School (Texas)